"Damages" is a song by Nigerian singer and record producer Tems. It was released on 17 September 2020. Written by Tems and produced by Spax, the song is the only single from Tems's first EP For Broken Ears, which was released on 25 September 2020.

The song peaked at number one on Apple Nigeria, number two on the Apple Music R&B Songs chart, and at number six on the TurnTable Top 50. On 24 November 2020, "Damages" became the most played song on Nigeria radio.

Composition
"Damages" is an alternative R&B / soul track. Lyrically, it show Tems asking her lover to take a stance in the relationship because she does not want the relationship to fail.

Critical reception
The song received positive reviews from critics. A review from Pulse Nigeria stated that "the song is between a girl power anthem and a refusal of bad treatment", while another review from BellaNaija noted that "The intimate beat of 'Damages' reflects the alternative R&B fused with a Neo-soul sound, and a sprinkle of the traditional Nigerian flavor".

Music video
The music video was released on 23 September 2020. Directed by Ademola Falamo, the visual shows Tems in a clubhouse with her groups of rebels.

Accolades

Charts

Weekly charts

Year-end charts

References

2020 singles
2020 songs
Tems (singer) songs
Songs written by Tems (singer)
Alternative R&B songs